Jon Spoelstra (born June 19, 1946) is an American author, sports marketer, and a former National Basketball Association (NBA) executive for the Buffalo Braves, Portland Trail Blazers, Denver Nuggets and New Jersey Nets. He is the co-founder of SRO Partners, and he currently serves as president of Mandalay Sports Entertainment. Spoelstra graduated from Notre Dame in 1966. He was a judge at the Miss America 2004 contest. He and his Filipino wife Elisa Celino have two children: Monica and Erik, the head coach of the Miami Heat. Spoelstra's father was sportswriter Watson Spoelstra.

NBA and business career
After graduating from Notre Dame in 1966, Spoelstra founded his first marketing company in 1970, The New School of Youth Marketing and Other Phenomena Inc. In the mid-1970s, his company obtained the rights to syndicate Notre Dame basketball games for $2,000 per game. In 1977, Spoelstra's career in the NBA began when the Buffalo Braves hired him as vice president of marketing. One of his biggest tasks he was assigned was to prevent a relocation of the Braves, although the team moved to San Diego ten months later. In 1979, then Portland Trail Blazers owner Larry Weinberg hired Spoelstra as senior vice president and general manager where he would serve for ten years before resigning.

The Denver Nuggets hired Spoelstra in 1989 as president and general manager, but he was fired after 90 days due to a dispute with management. Spoelstra returned to Portland, where he co-founded SRO Partners, and began teaching sports marketing at the University of Portland. He began consulting for the New Jersey Nets in March 1991, and became the team's president 1993. During his time with the Nets, Spoelstra implemented marketing tactics that increased the team's home game attendance from last in the league when he initially arrived to first in the NBA. His most famous marketing gimmick came in 1994, when he sent rubber chickens through direct mail with the tagline "Don't Fowl Out!" to Nets season ticket holders who had not yet renewed their season tickets.

Bibliography

See also

References

External links

National Basketball Association executives
Living people
Portland Trail Blazers executives
Denver Nuggets executives
Brooklyn Nets executives
Los Angeles Clippers executives
Place of birth missing (living people)
1946 births